Muhammad Faisal Khan Niazi is a Pakistani politician who is had been a member of the Provincial Assembly of the Punjab from October 2022 till January 2023. He previously served in this position from August 2018 till his resignation in August 2022.

Political career

He was elected to the Provincial Assembly of the Punjab as a candidate of the Pakistan Muslim League (N) (PML(N)) from Constituency PP-209 (Khanewal-VII) in 2018 Pakistani general election.

He resigned from his seat on 22 May 2022. He joined the Pakistan Tehreek-e-Insaf (PTI) on 15 July 2022. His resignation was accepted by the Election Commission of Pakistan on 5 August 2022.

He was re-elected to the Provincial Assembly of the Punjab as a candidate of the Pakistan Tehreek-e-Insaf (PTI) from Constituency PP-209 (Khanewal-VII) in a by-election that was called due to his resignation.

References

Living people
Pakistan Muslim League (N) MPAs (Punjab)
Year of birth missing (living people)